In 1980, an International Conference of Marxist–Leninist Parties and Organisations was organized by communist groups dissatisfied with the new leadership in China after the death of Mao Zedong and the overthrow of the Gang of Four. Participants were:
Ceylon Communist Party (Maoist)
Leninist Group of Senegal
Group for the Defense of Marxism–Leninism (Spain)
Mao Tse-Tung Circle (Denmark)
Marxist–Leninist Collective (Britain)
Marxist–Leninist Proletarian Communist Organization (Italy)
Revolutionary Communist Party of Chile
Reorganisation Committee CPI(ML)
For the Proletarian International (France)
Revolutionary Communist Party, USA
Revolutionary Communist Union (Dominican Republic)

The conference constituted a 'Revolutionary International Committee' (precursor to the Revolutionary Internationalist Movement), and issued "To the Marxist-Leninist, the Workers and the Opressed of all countries".

Sources
Rawal, Bhim Bahadur. Nepalma samyabadi andolan: udbhab ra vikas. Kathmandu: Pairavi Prakashan. p. 137-138.

References
 

1980 conferences
1980 in politics
International Conference of Marxist–Leninist Parties and Organizations (International Newsletter)